The U.S. Peace Council is a peace and disarmament activist organization founded in 1979. It is affiliated with the World Peace Council, a puppet organization of the Communist Party of the Soviet Union until its breakup in 1991, and represents its American section. Its current president is Alfred Marder.

Backdrop
In the early 1980s, NATO's decision to deploy a new generation of strategic nuclear warheads in Europe and U.S. President Ronald Reagan's planned military buildup program signaled the end of detente, a return to heightened Cold War tensions, and renewed fears of nuclear war.

Soviet involvement
In common with the larger World Peace Council and its affiliates, the USPC was a front group for Soviet interests, maintained close ties to the Communist Party USA, and was a mainstay of Soviet influence on the peace movement in the United States.

The Peace Council held three days  of organizational meetings at Georgetown University in Washington, D.C., attended by approximately 275 to 300 people from thirty-three states, Great Britain, and the Soviet Union.  They later were one of many groups that organized a June 1982 huge peace protest in New York City.  Edward J. O'Malley, assistant FBI director of intelligence, charged that KGB officers were instructed "to devote serious attention to the antiwar movement in the United States," and were infiltrating it.

Notable members
Over the years, leading members of the U.S. Peace Council have included:

Barbara Lee, current member of the U.S. Congress 
James E. Jackson (1914-2007), veteran civil rights leader. 
Gus Newport, former mayor of Berkeley, CA.
Alice Palmer, former Illinois State Senator
Leslie Cagan, coordinator of anti-war coalition United for Peace and Justice.

See also
World Peace Council

References

Cold War history of the United States
Soviet Union–United States relations
Political organizations based in the United States
World Peace Council
International Campaign to Abolish Nuclear Weapons